Intermix may refer to:

InterMix, an imprint of the Berkley Publishing Group
Intermix Media, company which owned MySpace
Intermix (band), 1990s band
Intermix (fashion), a New York-based clothing company